The Party of United Pensioners and Citizens of Macedonia ( – ПОПГМ, Partiјa na obedineti penzioneri i gragjani na Makedoniјa – POPGM) is a political party in North Macedonia. In the 2020 elections, the party won one seat as part of the SDSM-led coalition.

History 
The party was founded on 12 March 2013, with Boris Stojanoski as the chair and 250 others present. It was founded after comments made by then-Finance Minister Zoran Stavreski surrounding pensions, which the party claimed meant that "pensions in the Republic of Macedonia would be the lowest in the region compared to the average paid salary in the country". For the 2016 election, the party formed an electoral alliance with the SDSM and 3 other parties. However, it failed to win any seats. In the We Can coalition in 2020, led again by the SDSM, the party's leader, Ilija Nikolovski, was elected.

Ideology 
The main concern for the party is the rights of pensioners. The party's election programme calls for "amendments to the Law on Pension Disability Insurance" and calls pensions a "legal, inalienable and permanent personal right". It states that "NATO and EU membership is the best long-term framework for guaranteeing the preservation of national interests". The programme also proposes a self-sufficient nation with regards to food, and an increased role of agriculture in the Macedonian economy.

In its 2016 election manifesto, POPGM called for a number of electoral reforms, such as the reduction of MPs in the Assembly of North Macedonia from 123 to 90 and limiting the Prime Minister to 2 terms. In addition, it called for the complete secularisation of the government, judicial reform, and reducing emigration from North Macedonia.

References 

Pro-European political parties in North Macedonia
Political parties in North Macedonia
Pensioners' parties
Politics of North Macedonia